Quercus engelmannii, the Engelmann oak or Pasadena oak, is a species of oak in the white oak section (Quercus sect. Quercus), native to southern California and northwestern Baja California, Mexico.

Description
The bark is thick, furrowed, and light gray-brown.

The wood is dark brown and strong, but tends to warp and split upon drying, and is of low value as timber.

Distribution
The Engelmann oak ranges from the foothills of the San Gabriel Mountains in eastern Los Angeles County through the Santa Ana Mountains of Orange County and the western foothills and mesas of the Peninsular Ranges in Riverside and San Diego counties, extending into the Sierra Juárez and Sierra de San Pedro Mártir ranges of northern Baja California. It is generally found in savannas and woodlands above the dry coastal plain, but below the  elevation where colder winters prevail. The Engelmann oak has a smaller range than most California oaks, and suburban sprawl in the San Gabriel Valley has eliminated the oaks from most of the northern part of the range. The largest remaining stands of Engelmann oaks are on the Santa Rosa Plateau, near Murrieta in Riverside County, and on Black Mountain near Ramona in San Diego County.

Fossil evidence shows that Engelmann oaks once had a wider range, extending through what is now the Mojave and Sonoran deserts into eastern California and Arizona. The Engelmann oak is most closely related to the Arizona white oak (Q. arizonica) and Arizona blue oak (Q. oblongifolia), which are native to the subtropical pine-oak woodlands of Arizona and northern Mexico. The Engelmann oak is considered to be the northernmost species of subtropical oak, which was isolated from its closest relatives to the east by the drying of the southwestern deserts.

References

External links
Catalogue of Life: Quercus engelmannii

engelmannii
Flora of California
Trees of Baja California
Natural history of the California chaparral and woodlands
Natural history of the Peninsular Ranges
Trees of Mediterranean climate
Garden plants of North America
Drought-tolerant trees
Ornamental trees
Plants described in 1889
Oaks of Mexico